Gastric acid, gastric juice, or stomach acid is a digestive fluid formed within the stomach lining. With a pH between 1 and 3, gastric acid plays a key role in digestion of proteins by activating digestive enzymes, which together break down the long chains of amino acids of proteins. Gastric acid is regulated in feedback systems to increase production when needed, such as after a meal. Other cells in the stomach produce bicarbonate, a base, to buffer the fluid, ensuring a regulated pH. These cells also produce mucus – a viscous barrier to prevent gastric acid from damaging the stomach. The pancreas further produces large amounts of bicarbonate and secretes bicarbonate through the pancreatic duct to the duodenum to neutralize gastric acid passing into the digestive tract.

The active components of gastric acid are protons and chloride.  Often simplistically described as hydrochloric acid, these species are produced by parietal cells in the gastric glands in the stomach. The secretion is a complex and relatively energetically expensive process. Parietal cells contain an extensive secretory network (called canaliculi) from which the "hydrochloric acid" is secreted into the lumen of the stomach. The pH of gastric acid is 1.5 to 3.5 in the human stomach lumen, a level maintained by the proton pump H+/K+ ATPase. The parietal cell releases bicarbonate into the bloodstream in the process, which causes a temporary rise of pH in the blood, known as an alkaline tide.

The highly acidic environment in the stomach lumen degrades proteins (e.g., food). Peptide bonds, which comprise proteins, are labilized. The gastric chief cells of the stomach secrete enzymes for protein breakdown (inactive pepsinogen, and in infancy rennin). The low pH activates pepsinogen into the enzyme pepsin, which then aids digestion by breaking the amino acid bonds, a process called proteolysis. In addition, many microorganisms are inhibited or destroyed in an acidic environment, preventing infection or sickness.

Secretion
A typical adult human stomach will secrete about 1.5 liters of gastric acid daily. Gastric acid secretion is produced in several steps. Chloride and hydrogen ions are secreted separately from the cytoplasm of parietal cells and mixed in the canaliculi. Gastric acid is then secreted into the lumen of the gastric gland and gradually reaches the main stomach lumen. The exact manner in which the secreted acid reaches the stomach lumen is controversial, as acid must first cross the relatively pH-neutral gastric mucus layer.

Chloride and sodium ions are secreted actively from the cytoplasm of the parietal cell into the lumen of the canaliculus. This creates a negative potential of between −40and−70mV across the parietal cell membrane that causes potassium ions and a small number of sodium ions to diffuse from the cytoplasm into the parietal cell canaliculi.

The enzyme carbonic anhydrase catalyses the reaction between carbon dioxide and water to form carbonic acid. This acid immediately dissociates into hydrogen and bicarbonate ions. The hydrogen ions leave the cell through H+/K+ ATPase antiporter pumps.

At the same time, sodium ions are actively reabsorbed. This means that the majority of secreted K+ (potassium) and Na+ (Sodium)ions return to the cytoplasm. In the canaliculus, secreted hydrogen and chloride ions mix and are secreted into the lumen of the oxyntic gland.

The highest concentration that gastric acid reaches in the stomach is 160mM in the canaliculi. This is about 3 million times that of arterial blood, but almost exactly isotonic with other bodily fluids. The lowest pH of the secreted acid is 0.8, but the acid is diluted in the stomach lumen to a pH of between 1 and 3.

There is a small continuous basal secretion of gastric acid between meals of usually less than 10mEq/hour.

There are three phases in the secretion of gastric acid which increase the secretion rate in order to digest a meal:

 The cephalic phase: Thirty percent of the total gastric acid secretions to be produced is stimulated by anticipation of eating and the smell or taste of food. This signalling occurs from higher centres in the brain through the vagus nerve (Cranial Nerve X). It activates parietal cells to release acid and ECL cells to release histamine. The vagus nerve (CN X) also releases gastrin releasing peptide onto G cells. Finally, it also inhibits somatostatin release from D cells.
 The gastric phase: About sixty percent of the total acid for a meal is secreted in this phase. Acid secretion is stimulated by distension of the stomach and by amino acids present in the food.
 The intestinal phase: The remaining 10% of acid is secreted when chyme enters the small intestine, and is stimulated by small intestine distension and by amino acids. The duodenal cells release entero-oxyntin which acts on parietal cells without affecting gastrin.

Regulation of secretion

Gastric acid production is regulated by both the autonomic nervous system and several hormones. The parasympathetic nervous system, via the vagus nerve, and the hormone gastrin stimulate the parietal cell to produce gastric acid, both directly acting on parietal cells and indirectly, through the stimulation of the secretion of the hormone histamine from enterochromaffine-like cells (ECL). Vasoactive intestinal peptide, cholecystokinin, and secretin all inhibit production.

The production of gastric acid in the stomach is tightly regulated by positive regulators and negative feedback mechanisms. Four types of cells are involved in this process: parietal cells, G cells, D cells and enterochromaffine-like cells. Beside this, the endings of the vagus nerve (CN X) and the intramural nervous plexus in the digestive tract influence the secretion significantly.

Nerve endings in the stomach secrete two stimulatory neurotransmitters: acetylcholine and gastrin-releasing peptide. Their action is both direct on parietal cells and mediated through the secretion of gastrin from G cells and histamine from enterochromaffine-like cells. Gastrin acts on parietal cells directly and indirectly too, by stimulating the release of histamine.

The release of histamine is the most important positive regulation mechanism of the secretion of gastric acid in the stomach. Its release is stimulated by gastrin and acetylcholine and inhibited by somatostatin.

Neutralization
In the duodenum, gastric acid is neutralized by bicarbonate. This also blocks gastric enzymes that have their optima in the acid range of pH. The secretion of bicarbonate from the pancreas is stimulated by secretin. This polypeptide hormone gets activated and secreted from so-called S cells in the mucosa of the duodenum and jejunum when the pH in the duodenum falls below 4.5 to 5.0. The neutralization is described by the equation:

HCl + NaHCO3 → NaCl + H2CO3

The carbonic acid rapidly equilibrates with carbon dioxide and water through catalysis by carbonic anhydrase enzymes bound to the gut epithelial lining, leading to a net release of carbon dioxide gas within the lumen associated with neutralisation. In the absorptive upper intestine, such as the duodenum, both the dissolved carbon dioxide and carbonic acid will tend to equilibrate with the blood, leading to most of the gas produced on neutralisation being exhaled through the lungs.

Role in disease 
In hypochlorhydria and achlorhydria, there is low or no gastric acid in the stomach, potentially leading to problems as the disinfectant properties of the gastric lumen are decreased.  In such conditions, there is greater risk of infections of the digestive tract (such as infection with Vibrio or Helicobacter bacteria).

In Zollinger–Ellison syndrome and hypercalcemia, there are increased gastrin levels, leading to excess gastric acid production, which can cause gastric ulcers.

In diseases featuring excess vomiting, patients develop hypochloremic metabolic alkalosis (decreased blood acidity by H+ and chlorine depletion).

Pharmacology 
The proton pump enzyme is the target of proton pump inhibitors, used to increase gastric pH (and hence decrease stomach acidity) in diseases that feature excess acid. H2 antagonists  indirectly decrease gastric acid production. Antacids neutralize existing acid.

History 

The role of gastric acid in digestion was established in the 1820s and 1830s by William Beaumont on Alexis St. Martin, who, as a result of an accident, had a fistula (hole) in his stomach, which allowed Beaumont to observe the process of digestion and to extract gastric acid, verifying that acid played a crucial role in digestion.

See also 
 Stomach
 Digestion
 Gastroesophageal reflux disease
 Discovery and development of proton pump inhibitors
 Heartburn

References

External links 

 The Parietal Cell: Mechanism of Acid Secretion; Colorado State University

Acids
Body fluids
Acid